United Press International gave an NFL Most Valuable Player Award from 1948 through 1969, excepting 1949–50, and 1952. When the NFL's merger with the American Football League formed the National Football Conference (NFC) and American Football Conference (AFC) in 1970, UPI began awarding individual NFC and AFC player of the year awards.

References 

National Football League trophies and awards
Most valuable player awards